T. D. Crittenden (September 27, 1878 – February 17, 1938) was an American actor of the silent era. He appeared in more than 60 films between 1912 and 1924. He was born in Oakland, California, and died in Los Angeles, California.

Selected filmography

 When the Gods Played a Badger Game (1915)
 All for Peggy (1915)
 The Trust (1915)
 Jewel (1915)
 Lord John in New York (1915)
 The Mark of Cain (1916)
 Her Husband's Faith (1916)
 The Fighting Gringo (1917)
 The Honor of an Outlaw (1917)
 The Lash of Power (1917)
 The Saintly Sinner (1917)
 The Winged Mystery (1917)
 The Gray Ghost (1917)
 The Veiled Adventure (1919)
 The Miracle Man (1919)
 The Hoodlum (1919)
 The False Code (1919)
 The Little Shepherd of Kingdom Come (1920)
 Pinto (1920)
 A Tale of Two Worlds (1921)
 High Heels (1921)
 Bob Hampton of Placer (1921)
 The Old Nest (1921) as Dr. Horace Anthon
 Under Oath (1922)
 The Woman's Side (1922)
 The Hottentot (1922)
 Pioneer Trails (1923)

External links

1878 births
1938 deaths
American male film actors
American male silent film actors
Deaths by firearm in California
Male actors from California
20th-century American male actors